Adventure is a 2011 Hungarian drama film directed by József Sipos.

Plot summary

Cast
 Gerd Böckmann as Prof. Kádár
 Erika Marozsán as Anna Kádár
 Sándor Csányi as Zoltán
 Károly Eperjes as Dr. Szekeres
 Mari Törőcsik as Nono
 Eszter Nagy-Kálózy as Countess Olga
 Marianna Moór as Nurse
 Tibor Szilágyi as Minister
 Teri Tordai as Minister's wife
 Armand Kautzky as Hotel manager
 Judit Pogány as Sick woman

References

External links
 

2011 films
2011 romantic drama films
2010s Hungarian-language films
Hungarian romantic drama films